NA61/SHINE (standing for "SPS Heavy Ion and Neutrino Experiment") is a particle physics experiment at the Super Proton Synchrotron (SPS) at the European Organization for Nuclear Research (CERN). The experiment studies the hadronic final states produced in interactions of various beam particles (pions, protons and beryllium, argon, and xenon nuclei) with a variety of fixed nuclear targets at the SPS energies.

About 135 physicists from 14 countries and 35 institutions work in NA61/SHINE, led by Marek Gazdzicki.  NA61/SHINE is the second largest fixed target experiment at CERN.

Physics program 
The NA61/SHINE physics program has been designed to measure hadron production in three different types of collisions:
In nucleus–nucleus (heavy ion) collisions, in particular the measurement of fluctuations and long range correlations, with the aim to identify the properties of the onset of deconfinement and find evidence for the critical point of strongly interacting matter.
In proton–proton and proton–nucleus interactions needed as reference data for better understanding of nucleus–nucleus reactions; in particular with regards to correlations, fluctuations and high transverse momenta.
In hadron–nucleus interactions needed for neutrino (T2K, NOvA and future DUNE) and cosmic-ray experiments (Pierre Auger Observatory and KASCADE).

Detector 
The NA61/SHINE experiment uses a large acceptance hadron spectrometer located on the H2 beam line in the North Area of CERN. It consist of components used by the heavy ion NA49 experiment as well as those designed and
constructed for NA61/SHINE.

The main tracking devices are four large volume time projection chambers (TPCs), which are capable of detecting up to 70% of all charged particles created in the studied reactions. Two of them are located in the magnetic field of two super-conducting dipole magnets with maximum bending powers of 9 Tesla meters. Two others are positioned downstream of the magnets symmetrically with respect to the beam line. Additionally, four small volume TPCs placed directly along the beamline region are used in case of hadron and light ion beams.

The setup is supplemented by time of flight detector walls, which extend particle identification to low momenta ( < p ). Furthermore, the Projectile Spectator Detector (a calorimeter) is positioned downstream of the time of flight detectors to measure energy of projectile fragments.

Collected data

Extended program: after Long Shutdown 2 

In 2018 the NA61/SHINE collaboration published an addendum presenting an intent to upgrade the experimental facility and perform a new set of measurements after Long Shutdown 2. As in the original program, the new one proposes studies of hadron-nucleus and nucleus-nucleus interactions for heavy ions, neutrino and cosmic-ray physics.

The heavy ions program will focus on study of charm hadron production (mostly D mesons) in lead-lead interactions.

In 2020 the SPS and PS Experiments Committee (SPSC) recommended approval of beam time in 2021. The Research Board endorsed these recommendations.

See also
 List of Super Proton Synchrotron experiments

References

External links
 NA61/SHINE Collaboration web-site
 NA61/SHINE proposal
 NA49 Collaboration web-site
 NA61/SHINE Collaboration official instagram
 CERN-NA-061 experiment record on INSPIRE-HEP

Particle experiments
CERN experiments
Fixed-target experiments